The 1839—1840 United States Senate election in New York was held on February 5, 1839 and January 14, 1840. Incumbent Senator Nathaniel P. Tallmadge was re-elected to a second term in office over scattered opposition. 

Though his first election was as a Jacksonian Democrat, Tallmadge left the Democrats in 1838 to join a "Conservative" faction in support  of the new Whig Party ticket led by William Seward. The originally scheduled 1839 election for Tallmadge's seat ended without a conclusion because the Democratic-controlled Senate refused to nominate an opponent. After Whigs took the Senate in the 1839 election, Tallmadge was finally elected to the term expiring in 1845.

Background

Tallmadge party switch

Nathaniel P. Tallmadge had been elected as a Jacksonian Democrat in 1833 to this seat, and his term would expire on March 3, 1839.

In 1838, the Whigs nominated William H. Seward for Governor, the Democrats re-nominated Governor Marcy. A faction of former Democrats met on October 3 at Syracuse, New York under the name of "Conservatives," among them U.S. Senator Nathaniel P. Tallmadge, and endorsed the Whig candidates Seward and Bradish. Seward was elected Governor

Legislative composition

After the Panic of 1837, the new Whig Party managed to wrest the power from the Democratic Party. At the State election in November 1837, 101 Whigs and 27 Democrats were elected to the Assembly, and 6 Whigs and 2 Democrats were elected to the State Senate.

At the 1838 state election, 82 Whigs and 46 Democrats were elected to the Assembly, and 5 Whigs and 3 Democrats to the State Senate. This added up to 18 Democrats and 14 Whigs in the Senate. The 62nd New York State Legislature met from January 1 to May 7, 1839, at Albany, New York.

Candidates
The Whig State legislators met in caucus on January 31, 1839, to nominate candidates for State offices. The terms of Secretary of State John Adams Dix, State Comptroller Azariah C. Flagg, Attorney General Samuel Beardsley and State Treasurer Gamaliel H. Barstow would expire early in February, and the term of Nathaniel P. Tallmadge in the U.S. Senate early in March. Dix, Flagg and Beardsley were Democrats, and John C. Spencer, Bates Cooke and Willis Hall were nominated to succeed them. Dr. Barstow was a Whig but declined to continue in office, and Jacob Haight was nominated for Treasurer. Tallmadge, a former Democrat, was now a member of the Conservative faction, and having endorsed the Whig ticket at the last State election, had considerable support but also met some rejection. He was nominated by a "strong vote." (see Hammond, page 511).

1839 election
On February 4, 1839, the State Legislature elected on joint ballot Spencer, Cooke, Hall and Haight to the offices they were nominated for, but on the next day they could not agree on a U.S. Senator.

The Assembly nominated Nathaniel P. Tallmadge "by the votes of all the Whig members." (see Hammond, page 512)

Although the Democratic State Senate majority did not object to be outvoted on joint ballot for the election of Whigs to State offices, they rejected the idea of electing a renegade Democrat to the U.S. Senate, and took refuge to the only means to defeat Tallmadge: They did not nominate anybody, following the precedents of 1819–1820 and 1825–1826, so that a joint ballot could not be held. On the first ballot, Tallmadge received 13 votes out of 31 cast, all Whigs. The Democratic vote was scattered among many men, nobody receiving more than 2. Four more ballots were held with a similar result. On the sixth ballot, all Whigs and two Democrats voted for Samuel Beardsley, who received 16 votes, one short of the necessary number for a nomination. The Democrats then abandoned further balloting, fearing that the Whigs would vote for anybody who received by chance three Democratic votes, just to force any nomination, thus enabling the Legislature to proceed to the joint ballot.

No further action was taken by this Legislature, and the seat became vacant on March 4, 1839.

1839 state legislature election
At the State election in November 1839, 7 Whigs and 3 Democrats were elected to the State Senate, which gave the Whigs a majority, the first anti-Bucktails/Jacksonian/Democratic majority in 20 years. The 63rd New York State Legislature met from January 7 to May 14, 1840, at Albany, New York. The strength of the parties in the Assembly, as shown by the vote for Speaker, was: 68 for Whig George Washington Patterson and 56 for Democrat Levi S. Chatfield.

1840 election
Nathaniel P. Tallmadge received a majority in both the Assembly and the Senate, and was declared elected.

Aftermath
Tallmadge re-took his seat on January 27, 1840, and remained in office until June 17, 1844, when he resigned to be appointed Governor of Wisconsin Territory. Daniel S. Dickinson was appointed to fill the vacancy temporarily, and subsequently elected by the State Legislature to succeed Tallmadge.

Notes

Sources
The New York Civil List compiled in 1858 (see: pg. 63 for U.S. Senators; pg. 132 for State Senators 1839 and 1840; pg. 221f for Members of Assembly 1839; pg. 223f for Members of Assembly 1840;)
Members of the 26th United States Congress (omits date on which Tallmadge took his seat)
Members of the 28th United States Congress
History of Political Parties in the State of New-York, Vol. II by Jabez Delano Hammond (State election, 1839: pg. 486; U.S. Senate election 1839: pg. 512; State election, 1839: page 517; Speaker election, 1840: pg. 519; U.S. Senate election 1840: pg. 523)
The Tribune Almanac and Political Register for 1838 published by the New York Tribune, edited by Horace Greeley (State election result 1837: page 10)
Journal of the Senate (62nd Session) (1839; pg. 107–113)
Journal of the Senate (63rd Session) (1839; pg. 86)

1839
New York
New York
New York
United States Senate
United States Senate
United States Senate 1839